João Miguel Sequeira José (born 7 June 1978 in Portimão) is a male volleyball player from Portugal. He finished in 8th place with the Men's National Team at the 2002 FIVB Men's World Championship, where he was named Best Blocker of the tournament.

Awards

Individuals
 2002 FIVB World Championship "Best Spiker"

References

External links
FIVB Profile

1978 births
Living people
People from Portimão
Portuguese men's volleyball players
Sportspeople from Faro District